Carl Andersen may refer to:

 Carl Andersen (gymnast) (1879–1967), Danish architect who competed as a gymnast in the 1906 and 1908 Olympics
 Carl Rudolf Andersen (1899–1983), Danish gymnast who competed in the 1920 Olympics
Carl Albert Andersen (1876–1951), Norwegian pole vaulter, high jumper, and gymnast
Carl Thorvald Andersen (1835–1916), Danish architect
Carl-Ebbe Andersen (1929–2009), Danish rower
Herman Carl Andersen (1897–1978), U.S. Representative from Minnesota
Carl Joachim Andersen (1847–1909), Danish flutist, conductor and composer

See also
Carl Anderson (disambiguation)
Karl Anderson (born 1980), American wrestler
Karl Anderson (athlete) (1900–1989), American track and field athlete
Karl Ricks Anderson (born 1937), American historian